Samuel Johnston (18 September 1866 – 25 April 1910) was an Irish footballer who made his international debut for Ireland at the age of 15 years 154 days - a record which stands to this day. Johnston, who played as a centre forward, played club football for Distillery between 1881 and 1888.

References

1866 births
1910 deaths
Irish association footballers (before 1923)
Pre-1950 IFA international footballers
Association football forwards
Lisburn Distillery F.C. players
Association footballers from Belfast